Dmitri Vladimirovich Bayda (born 5 November 1975) is a former Russian professional football player.

Honours
 Russian Second Division Zone East best striker: 2005.

External links
 

1975 births
Living people
People from Yuzhno-Sakhalinsk
Russian footballers
Association football forwards
Russian expatriate footballers
Expatriate footballers in Belarus
FC Khimki players
FC Dynamo Barnaul players
FC Metallurg Lipetsk players
FC Torpedo Mogilev players
FC Zvezda Irkutsk players
FC Sakhalin Yuzhno-Sakhalinsk players
FC Orenburg players
Belarusian Premier League players
FC Dynamo Makhachkala players
Sportspeople from Sakhalin Oblast